"Truganini" is a song by Australian rock band Midnight Oil from their eighth studio album, Earth and Sun and Moon (1993). It was inspired by Truganini, a Nuenonne woman from south-east Tasmania. The song uses a recurring Australian issue—drought—to pose the question "what for?", meaning "why did Europeans bother to colonise this harsh place?" The song mentions two prominent indigenous Australians (Truganini and Albert Namatjira) whose lives were altered by European settlement and discusses current day sentiment towards the old country, namely the monarchy. 

"Truganini" was a chart success in several countries when released in March 1993, peaking at number four in New Zealand, number 10 in Australia, number 11 in Canada and number 29 in the United Kingdom. In the United States, it peaked at number four on the Billboard Modern Rock Tracks chart and number 10 on the Album Rock Tracks chart. The single's liner notes included the claim that Truganini was the "sole surviving Tasmanian Aborigine" when she died. This sparked protest by some of the 7,000 people who identify as Tasmanian Aboriginal. Lead singer Peter Garrett issued an apology.

Live performances
The band performed the song live for American audiences as the musical guest on the American television show Saturday Night Live on 8 May 1993, when Christina Applegate served as host.

Track listings

Charts

Weekly charts

Year-end charts

References

External links
 Video

1993 singles
1993 songs
Columbia Records singles
Midnight Oil songs
Song recordings produced by Nick Launay
Songs about Australia
Songs against racism and xenophobia
Songs written by Rob Hirst
Songs written by Jim Moginie